Marya Shakil is an Indian television journalist and TV news anchor in CNN-News18. She hosts the network's shows News Epicenter and Reporters Project.

Early life and background
Marya's father Shakil Ahmad Khan was a politician from Makhpa, Makhdumpur, Jehanabad district, Bihar. He was initially in Communist Party of India, later switched to Rashtriya Janata Dal, and then joined Janata Dal (United) in 2010. Khan was member of Bihar legislative assembly twice. He was a senior cabinet minister for energy, law, minority welfare and public relations department for ten years in the Rabri Devi government, prior to joining Janata Dal (United)  in 2010. Her father was also a criminal lawyer in Patna High Court and died in August 2012. Marya has two sisters.

Marya completed her masters in Mass communication from Jamia Millia Islamia in 2005. She did internship at Bennett Coleman and Co. Ltd. (Times Group) in 2004. Marya joined CNN-IBN (Network 18) in 2005. She did a 30 Minutes documentary on 2008 Bihar flood. Ahead of 2012 Uttar Pradesh Legislative Assembly election, Marya’s 30-minute show, ‘The Muslim Manifesto’, documented the “layers of change” within the Muslim community.

Personal life
Marya is married to Irfan Khan, who has started BlogMint company. The couple lives in Noida.

Awards 
Marya has won the Ramnath Goenka Excellence in Journalism Awards as Best Political Journalist (Broadcast) in 2012 for her show on 2012 UP elections and then again in 2014 for her 2014 general elections coverage, including a documentary on Indian Prime Minister Narendra Modi.

 2021, Best Current Affairs Presenter, Epicentre, 26th Asian Television Awards (Nominated)

References

External links 
 Marya Shakil on Twitter

Indian television journalists
Living people
1983 births
Indian women television journalists